Johnny Earl Roland (born May 21, 1943) is a former American football player and coach.  He played as a running back in the National Football League (NFL) for the St. Louis Cardinals from 1966 to 1972 and the New York Giants in 1973.  Roland played college football at the University of Missouri, where he was a consensus All-American in 1965 as a defensive back.  After his playing days, he served as an assistant coach with the number of NFL teams and at the University of Notre Dame.  Roland was inducted into the College Football Hall of Fame as a player in 1998.

Playing career

High school
Roland played high school football at Roy Miller High School in Corpus Christi, Texas and led the team to a 13–1 record and the 4A State Championship.

College
Roland played college football at the University of Missouri.  In 1962, he rushed for 830 yards, seventh best total in the nation, and scored 78 points, ninth in the nation.  This rushing total included 155 yards against Oklahoma State University and 104 against Iowa State University.  One of his most notable games that season was his first varsity game, where he rushed for 171 yards and three touchdowns.  That season, Roland earned his first All-Big Eight Conference honor.

Thought to have stolen a pair of tires, Roland was forced to leave the team and the school during the 1963 season and worked that year in Kansas City.  He was welcomed back to the team in 1964 and was moved to the defensive back position.  He led his team to a 6–3–1 record and was again chosen as an All-Big Eight Conference player.  In 1965, Roland led the Tigers to an 8–2–1 record and a victory in the 1966 Sugar Bowl over the Florida Gators, 20–18.  That season, he was named the team's captain, was voted a College All-American, and again was on the All-Big Eight team.  By being named the captain of the 1965 team, Roland was the first African-American to serve as the captain for any University of Missouri athletic team.

Roland had his jersey retired (#23) by Missouri and was inducted to the College Football Hall of Fame in 2005.

Professional
Roland was drafted in the fourth round of the 1965 NFL Draft by the St. Louis Cardinals and was named UPI NFL-NFC Rookie of the Year in 1966.  He played for seven seasons with the Cardinals, and he became the franchise's leading rusher (since broken).  He then went on to play for one season with the New York Giants.  Roland played in 103 NFL games, during which he rushed for 3,750 yards and 28 touchdowns on 1,015 attempts, caught 153 passes for 1,430 yards and six touchdowns, returned 49 punts for 452 yards with two touchdowns, returned 22 kickoffs for 444 yards, and completed five of 13 passes for 130 yards and one touchdown.

Coaching career

First stint with Green Bay (1974)
Roland's former college coach, Dan Devine, hired Roland to be the Green Bay Packers special assignments coach in 1974.  While there, he coordinated some of the first computer programs used by Packers coaches, as well as scouting college talent and coaching.

Notre Dame (1975)
Roland then followed Devine to the University of Notre Dame, where he was an assistant coach in 1975.

Philadelphia Eagles (1976–1978)
Roland was the running backs coach for the Philadelphia Eagles from 1976 to 1978 under head coach Dick Vermeil.  During his time there, Roland coached Wilbert Montgomery, who helped lead Philadelphia to Super Bowl XV and remains the Eagles' all-time leading rusher.

Chicago Bears (1983–1992)
Roland was hired by Chicago Bears head coach Mike Ditka in 1983 to help coach running back Walter Payton, who at the time stood 2,108 yards from Jim Brown's NFL rushing record and then broke the mark in 1984.  Roland also coached Payton's successor Neal Anderson, whom Roland coached into the Bears' second all-time leading rusher.  The Bears during Roland's tenure led the league in rushing four times, and finished among the top three in seven of his 11 seasons.  From 1984 to 1988, Chicago rushed for 160.9 yards per game, went 62–17 (.785), made the playoffs five straight years and won Super Bowl XX.

New York Jets (1993–1994)
Roland was the running backs coach for the New York Jets from 1993 to 1994.

St. Louis Rams (1995–1996)
Roland joined the St. Louis Rams in 1995 and coached running back Jerome Bettis during Bettis' last year with the Rams before playing for the Pittsburgh Steelers.

Arizona Cardinals (1997–2003)
Roland joined the Arizona Cardinals in 1997.  During his final season with the Cardinals in 2003, he coached Emmitt Smith who was traded by the Dallas Cowboys in the offseason.  By coaching Smith, Roland became the only coach to work with the two all-time leading NFL rushers (Payton and Smith).

Second stint with Green Bay (2004)
Roland started his second stint with Green Bay in 2004 as the coach for Ahman Green, who was the National Football Conference's leading rusher in 2003 and second all-time leading rusher in franchise history.  Roland coached in Green Bay for only one season before being hired by the New Orleans Saints.  He left the Packers because he reportedly had differences with head coach Mike Sherman and the Packers had reservations about Roland's work ethic.

New Orleans Saints (2005)
Roland joined the New Orleans Saints in 2005 under head coach Jim Haslett.  Haslett was fired the following season and replaced with Sean Payton, who chose not to retain Roland.

Personal life
Roland lives in St. Louis, and has two sons, Johnny, Jr. and James, and one daughter, Cynnamon.  He owned part of a radio station, KIRL, in St. Louis, until it filed for bankruptcy in 2004.  He also owns WRBZ in Wetumpka, Alabama. Roland was inducted into the St. Louis Sports Hall of Fame in 2014.

References

External links
 

1943 births
Living people
American football defensive backs
American football running backs
American radio executives
Arizona Cardinals coaches
Chicago Bears coaches
Green Bay Packers coaches
Missouri Tigers football players
New Orleans Saints coaches
New York Giants players
New York Jets coaches
Notre Dame Fighting Irish football coaches
Philadelphia Eagles coaches
St. Louis Cardinals (football) players
St. Louis Rams coaches
All-American college football players
College Football Hall of Fame inductees
Eastern Conference Pro Bowl players
Sportspeople from Corpus Christi, Texas
Players of American football from Texas
African-American coaches of American football
African-American players of American football
21st-century African-American people
20th-century African-American sportspeople